Southern Illinois Chowder is a thick stew or soup, very different from the New England and Manhattan chowders. In Edwards County, Illinois, it refers to both the food and to the social gathering at which it is prepared and served. It is believed to have been brought to the area by the earliest settlers, or "backwoodsmen". Traditionally, the chowder time season commences when the first tomatoes ripen and closes with the first heavy frost.

Etymology
The term "chowder" is derived from French chaudière 'stew pot', partially cognate with cauldron.

Preparation
Chowder is usually cooked outside in large black kettles or cauldrons, ranging in size from 20 to 70 gallons. The ingredients are added to boiling water according to their cooking time, so that all are cooked and ready at the same time. The main ingredients are beef, chicken, tomatoes, cabbage, lima beans, and green beans. Traditionally, squirrel meat was a common addition. Chowder is usually considered ready when the ingredients have amalgamated into a fairly thick soup, usually taking four or more hours. The kettles must be stirred almost continuously so that the chowder does not "catch" on the base and scorch. This is accomplished using a wooden blade known as a "paddle". Measuring between eighteen and twenty-four inches long and six to eight inches wide, a paddle has had several bored holes through the blade and a handle attached at right angles.  One cook will paddle the chowder - causing the bones to rise - and another cook, called "the bone picker," will use tongs to pick out bones as they separate from the meat.

In 1958, the County Commissioners of Edwards County, Illinois, proclaimed their county the "Chowder Capital of the World."

See also
Brunswick stew, a stew historically made with squirrel meat
Burgoo, a traditional Mid-South stew now made in quantities at social gatherings
Booyah, a stew popularly made and served at socials in Minnesota and Wisconsin
 List of soups
 List of stews

References

Further reading
Edwards County Historical Historical Society, Albion, Illinois, A History of Edwards County, Illinois Volume One 1980
Elm River Chowder held in northern Wayne County, Illinois on the first Saturday in September.

American soups
Edwards County, Illinois
Cuisine of Illinois
American stews
Beef dishes
Chicken soups
Cabbage soups